The Veirs Mill Road Line, designated Route Q1, Q2, Q4, Q5, Q6, is a daily bus route operated by the Washington Metropolitan Area Transit Authority between Silver Spring station and Shady Grove station of the Red Line of the Washington Metro. The line operates every 16–30 minutes at all times at a combined frequency of 10 minutes during weekday peak-hours, 15 minutes during the weekday midday and weekends, and 30 minutes during the late nights. All trips roughly take 55–60 minutes. The line operates along the Veirs Mill Road corridor connecting passengers to various Metro stations and communities.

Background

The Veirs Mill Road Line consists of routes Q1, Q2, Q4, Q5, and Q6. Routes Q1 and Q2 operate between Silver Spring station and Shady Grove station. Route Q4 operates between Silver Spring station and Rockville station. Routes Q5 and Q6 operate between Shady Grove station and Wheaton station. Routes Q1 and Q2 plus Q5 and Q6 operate under the same routing except routes Q2 and Q6 serve Montgomery College while routes Q1 and Q5 skip the college. The scheduling of the routes goes as the following:
 Route Q1 operates during early mornings and late nights only daily.
 Route Q2 operates between the AM Peak Hours and after 7:00 PM on weekdays, and before 8:00 AM and after 5:45 PM on Saturday. Service does not operate on Sundays.
 Route Q4 operates daily until 7:00 PM between Monday and Saturday and until 5:00 PM on Sunday.
 Route Q5 operates on Sundays only.
 Route Q6 operates from Monday through Saturday until 7:00 PM. Service does not operate on Sundays.

Routes Q1, Q2, Q4, Q5, and Q6 currently operate out of Montgomery division. It sometimes utilizes articulated buses due to its high ridership volume.

Route Stops

History
Route Q2 originally operated under the Washington Suburban Lines bus company when it was introduced in the 1940s. The line provided service along Veirs Mill Road between Wheaton and Rockville Maryland and later Silver Spring. The Washington Suburban Lines was later acquired by DC Transit, and then became a WMATA route on February 4, 1973, when WMATA acquired DC Transit.

The Veirs Mill Road Line originally consisted of routes Q1, Q2, and Q7. They would all operate between Silver Spring station and Montgomery Village. The Q1 would make some trips to the U.S. Atomic Energy Commission in Germantown, while the Q7 would operate through Wheaton Woods via Aspen Hill Road and Parkland Drive.

On February 21, 1978, routes Q1 and Q7 were eliminated. Meanwhile, the Q2 would be truncated from Montgomery Village to the Rockville Campus of Montgomery College. On the same day, routes Q4 and Q8 would be added to the line. Route Q4 would operate between Silver Spring station and Rock Creek Village, and route Q8 would operate between Montgomery Mall and Silver Spring station.

On December 15, 1984, when both Shady Grove station and Rockville station opened, route Q2 was extended to terminate at Shady Grove station and route Q4 was extended to Rockville station.

On January 27, 1985, route Q4 would be redesignated as the Parkland Drive Line. That designation would remain until 1994, when it would be replaced by current Ride On route 48. On the same day, Metrobus route Q8 would be eliminated and replaced by Ride On routes 38 and 47. The 38 would replace the portion of the route between Westfield Wheaton and Congressional Plaza, while the 47 would replace the portion of the route that operated along Seven Locks Road. 

On September 22, 1990, the line was slightly rerouted to serve the Wheaton station bus bays when the station opened. On the same day, route Q1 would be reincarnated to operate between Wheaton station and Rockville station. It would provide supplemental express service along Veirs Mill Road during rush hour. 

Routes Q1 and Q2 would operate the Veirs Mill Road Line on its own between Silver Spring station and Shady Grove station via Montgomery College along Georgia Avenue and Veirs Mill Road.

On January 13, 2001, route Q1 was discontinued and replaced by route Q2.

In 2009, WMATA proposed to restructure the Veirs Mill Road Line. In coordination with Montgomery County and the Maryland Department of Transportation, WMATA proposed to restructure the Q2 in order to address continuing performance-related issues, including schedule adherence, bus bunching, traffic congestion, delays, passenger crowding, and long trip duration.

WMATA proposed to split the Q2 into two routes into a Q2A and Q2B. Route Q2A would operate between Shady Grove station and Wheaton station while route Q2B will operate between Rockville station and Silver Spring station. The proposal will provide overlapping service along Veirs Mill Road between Wheaton and Rockville operating daily with a 7.5-minute peak service and 15-minute off-peak service, while providing wider headways along the Maryland Route 355 segment (Shady Grove to Rockville), where parallel Ride On service is available and the well-served Georgia Avenue segment (Wheaton to Silver Spring, where parallel Metrobus service is available) with 15-minute peak service and 30-minute off-peak service. A new limited-stop route along Viers Mill Road will be implemented in the future.

The proposal was brought up as early as 2003 and discussed in 2005. The Q2 is one of the most popular routes in the entire system with an average weekday ridership of 10,200 riders.

In later proposals, WMATA proposed to introduce a Q4 and Q6 to operate alongside route Q2. The Q4 will operate between Silver Spring and Rockville stations and the Q6 will operate between Shady Grove and Wheaton stations. Performance measures goes as the following:

Financial impacts to the proposed changes goes as follow:

On December 27, 2009, changes were made to the Veirs Mill Road.

Route Q2 kept its same routing, but would only operate during early morning and post PM peak service and discontinue Sunday service. A new route Q1 would operate during early morning and late nights as well but would skip Montgomery College. A new Q4, Q5, and Q6 were also introduced to operate alongside the Q1 and Q2. Route Q4 would operate between Rockville station and Silver Spring station and routes Q5 and Q6 will operate between Shady Grove station and Wheaton station. Route Q4 would operate daily, route Q5 would skip Montgomery College and only operating on Sunday, and route Q6 will operate Monday through Saturdays serving Montgomery College. Additionally, a new limited-stop route along Viers Mill Road would be implemented in the new future.

The new line will have a combined frequency of 7–8 minutes during weekday peak hours and 15 minutes during off-peak hours.

When the Paul S. Sarbanes Transit Center at Silver Spring station opened, routes Q1, Q2, and Q4 were rerouted from its bus stop along Wayne Avenue to Bus Bay 218 at the transit center on the second level sharing the bay with route J5.

In 2015, WMATA proposed to simplify the Viers Mill Road Line. WMATA proposed terminate the line at Wheaton station when Metrorail is open and coordinate all routes into two routes. The line will still operate to Silver Spring station only during the early mornings and late nights when Metrorail isn't operating. This will help buses to arrive on time by having them avoid the heavy traffic near the Capital Beltway and simplify the bus service by reducing the number of routes from five to two according to WMATA. Alternative service would be provided by routes Y2, Y7, and Y8.

WMATA also proposed to implement a new limited stop MetroExtra route Q9 between Wheaton station and Rockville station during the weekdays to help relieve crowding.

On June 26, 2016, as part of a plot program, customers traveling southbound on Q Line buses will be able to transfer to Red Line trains at Wheaton station or Forest Glen station and continue southbound to Silver Spring station free of charge using their SmarTrip card. The same thing applies to Northbound service. However, customers choosing the northbound will be charged the regular fare, but will receive a credit for the free Red Line trip applied to their card within three days. The free Red Line trip only applies to customers boarding the Red Line at Silver Spring or Forest Glen stations who then transfer to the Q Line buses at Wheaton northbound and Forest Glen and Silver Spring stations Southbound. Customers traveling outside this area on the Red Line will be charged the regular rail fare.

During WMATA's FY2021 budget year, WMATA proposed to eliminate service between Rockville station and Shady Grove station with all routes terminating at Rockville station and consolidated into route Q4. This was because service is duplicate to both Red Line and Ride On and would cut costs terminating the line at Rockville. According to performance measures, 1,539 weekday riders (24%) would be required to transfer, 861 Saturday riders (18%) would be required to transfer, and 626 Sunday riders (18%) would be required to transfer.

Montgomery County residents expressed concerns over the proposed changes. Many residents voiced their concerns of the proposed changes on economic impacts and proposed loss of service. Members of the Montgomery County Council and state delegation sent a letter to WMATA Chairman Paul Smedberg quoting;

The Metrobus routes currently recommended for service reductions, including the Q, J, L and Z bus lines, provide transportation for many of our most transit-dependent residents," the lawmakers wrote. "Service reductions will disproportionately affect students commuting to Montgomery College, seniors running daily errands and service workers accessing jobs. Roughly 65,000 Montgomery riders use Metrobus on a daily basis, and for many these bus routes are their only source of transportation.

Tom Hucker stated:

The WMATA General Manager's proposed bus cuts would have a severe negative impact on riders, and we want to make sure residents have their voice heard before the board makes their decision on the proposal

At least 30 Montgomery County leaders called on WMATA not to cut Metrobus routes in the region, saying it will "disproportionately affect" students, seniors, and service workers with no other source of transportation. The letter's signatories include state senators Craig Zucker, Susan Lee, and Cheryl Kagan, Maryland State Delegates Marc Korman, Sara Love, and Julie Palakovich Carr and all nine members of the county council. In the letter to Metro Chairman Paul Smedberg, members of the Montgomery County Council and state delegation said they opposed the cuts, which are part of WMATA's proposed FY 2021 operating budget, and urged the agency to prioritize "maintaining frequent and reliable service."

According to 343 voters to the line, 21% of voters were in favor of the changes, 60% were against the changes, and 19% were undecided. Most of the responses were concerns of passengers trips becoming longer and not wanting to transfer to other buses.

On April 2, 2020, WMATA would back out of the proposal due to the major customer and political pushback.

During the COVID-19 pandemic, the line was reduced to operate on its Saturday supplemental schedule beginning on March 16, 2020. However beginning on March 18, 2020, the line was further reduced to operate on its Sunday schedule with routes Q2 and Q6 being suspended and replaced by routes Q1 and Q5. Weekend service was also suspended beginning on March 21, 2020. The line restored its weekday schedule beginning on August 23, 2020. However, route Q2 and Q6 Saturday schedule remained suspended.

On September 26, 2020, WMATA proposed to eliminate all route Q2 and Q6 Saturday service and replace them with routes Q1 and Q5 full time. They also will eliminate the Q5 weekday trips and reduce service due to low federal funding. Routes Q2 and Q6 has not operated on Saturdays since March 14, 2020 due to Metro's response to the COVID-19 pandemic. However, on September 5, 2021, all Q2 and Q6 Saturday service was restored.

References

Q1